This is a list of newspapers published in the former Ukrainian Soviet Socialist Republic between 1919 and 1991.

Central newspapers

Regional newspapers (oblast level)

Others (local level)

See also
 List of newspapers in Ukraine
 Printed media in the Soviet Union

Communist newspapers
Eastern Bloc mass media
Newspapers published in the Soviet Union
Ukraine, List of newspapers in Soviet
Newspapers 
Newspapers 
Ukrainian SSR
Newspapers